HD 183263 b is an extrasolar planet orbiting the star HD 183263. This planet has a minimum mass of 3.6 times more than Jupiter and takes 625 days to orbit the star. The planet was discovered on January 25, 2005 using multiple Doppler measurements of five nearby FGK main-sequence stars and subgiants obtained during the past 4–6 years at the Keck Observatory in Mauna Kea, Hawaii. These stars, namely, HD 183263, HD 117207, HD 188015, HD 45350, and HD 99492, all exhibit coherent variations in their Doppler shifts consistent with a planet in Keplerian motion, and the results were published in a paper by Geoffrey Marcy et al. Photometric observations were acquired for four of the five host stars with an automatic telescope at Fairborn Observatory. The lack of brightness variations in phase with the radial velocities supports planetary-reflex motion as the cause of the velocity variations. An additional planet in the system was discovered later.

See also
 HD 183263 c

References

External links
 
 
 
 

Aquila (constellation)
Exoplanets discovered in 2005
Giant planets
Exoplanets detected by radial velocity